William Barberie Howell (July 5, 1865 – April 4, 1927) was an Associate Justice and Chief Justice of the United States Customs Court and previously was a member and President of the Board of General Appraisers.

Education and career

Born on July 5, 1865, in Freehold Township, New Jersey, Howell attended the Spencerian Business College in 1882. He received a Bachelor of Laws in 1889 from Columbian University School of Law (now George Washington University Law School) and received a Master of Laws in 1890 from the same institution. He served as a clerk and private secretary with the United States Department of the Treasury in Washington, D.C. from 1882 to 1897. He serve as an assistant secretary of the Treasury in Washington, D.C. from 1897 to 1899.

Federal judicial service

Howell was nominated by President William McKinley on February 8, 1899, to a seat on the Board of General Appraisers vacated by member George H. Sharpe. He was confirmed by the United States Senate on February 20, 1899, and received his commission on February 24, 1899. He served as president from 1925 to 1926. Howell was reassigned by operation of law to the United States Customs Court on May 28, 1926, to a new Associate Justice seat authorized by 44 Stat. 669. He served as Chief Justice from 1926 to 1927. His service terminated on April 4, 1927, due to his death. He was succeeded by Associate Justice William Josiah Tilson.

References

Sources
 

1865 births
1927 deaths
Judges of the United States Customs Court
People from Freehold Township, New Jersey
Detroit Business Institute alumni
George Washington University Law School alumni
Members of the Board of General Appraisers
United States Article I federal judges appointed by William McKinley